Henry Davis (born September 21, 1999) is an American professional baseball catcher in the Pittsburgh Pirates organization. Davis was selected first overall by the Pirates in the 2021 Major League Baseball draft.

Amateur career
Davis attended Fox Lane High School in Bedford, New York. As a junior in 2017, he batted .429. In 2018, his senior year, he batted .441 with seven home runs and 32 runs batted in (RBI). He was named the Perfect Game New York Player of the Year, the Section 1 Player of the Year, and also earned all-state honors. He was undrafted in the 2018 Major League Baseball draft and enrolled at the University of Louisville to play college baseball for the Louisville Cardinals.

In 2019, Davis' freshman season at Louisville, he appeared in 45 games (making 35 starts) and batted .280 with three home runs and 23 RBI. After the 2019 season, he played collegiate summer baseball with the Bourne Braves of the Cape Cod Baseball League. As a sophomore in 2020, he hit .372 with three home runs and 13 RBI over 14 games before the season was cancelled due to the COVID-19 pandemic. For the 2021 season, Davis hit .370/.482/.663 with 15 home runs and 48 RBI while registering 31 walks and 24 strikeouts over fifty games. He was named to the All-Atlantic Coast Conference First-Team and also garnered All-American honors.

Professional career
The Pittsburgh Pirates selected Davis with the first overall selection of the 2021 Major League Baseball draft. On July 18, 2021, Davis signed with Pittsburgh for a $6.5 million signing bonus. Davis made his professional debut with the Rookie-level Florida Complex League Pirates on August 3, homering in his third at-bat of the game. After two games, he was promoted to the Greensboro Grasshoppers of the High-A East. After six games with Greensboro, he was placed on the injured list with an oblique injury, and missed the remainder of the season. Over eight games for the 2021 season, Davis batted .308 with three home runs and seven RBIs.

Davis returned to Greensboro to open the 2022 season. After batting .341 with five home runs and 22 RBI over 22 games with Greensboro, he was promoted to the Altoona Curve of the Double-A Eastern League in early May. After two games with the Curve, he was placed on the injured list with a wrist injury. He returned to play in mid-June. He was selected to represent the Pirates alongside Mike Burrows at the 2022 All-Star Futures Game. In early July, he was placed back on the injured list with an injury to the same wrist. Over 59 games for the season, Davis batted .264 with ten home runs and 42 RBI.  He was selected to play in the Arizona Fall League for the Surprise Saguaros after the season.

References

External links

Louisille Cardinals bio

1999 births
Living people
Baseball players from New York (state)
Baseball catchers
Bourne Braves players
Louisville Cardinals baseball players
Florida Complex League Pirates players
Greensboro Grasshoppers players
Altoona Curve players
Bradenton Marauders players